Patrick Brown (born Jan 23, 1969) is an Australian photojournalist and photographer.   

Patrick Brown has devoted himself to documenting critical issues around the world often ignored by the mainstream media. His groundbreaking project on the illegal trade in endangered animals won a World Press Photo Award in 2004 and a multimedia award from POYi in 2008. Patrick’s book Trading to Extinction was nominated in the ten best photo documentary books of 2014 by AmericanPhoto. In 2019 he published No Place On Earth which provides an intimate portrait of the survivors of the persecution of the Myanmar’s Rohingya population in 2017. 

Patrick has been the recipient of numerous awards and prizes including the 2019 FotoEvidence Book Award and two World Press Photo Awards. His work has been exhibited internationally at Centre of Photography in New York, the Metropolitan Museum of Photography in Tokyo, Visa pour l’Image in France and his work is also held in private collections.

Patrick is a regular contributor to a wealth of publications, including, Rolling Stone, The New Yorker, TIME, Newsweek, Vanity Fair, National Geographic and Mother Jones, and has worked with such organisations as UNICEF, UNHCR, Fortify Rights and Human Rights Watch.

Life and work 

Brown was born in Sheffield, England, but spent his childhood in the Middle East and Africa before his family finally settled in Perth, Western Australia.

He is the author of the award-winning, 2014 book, Trading to Extinction, which documents the illegal animal trade in Asia. The book was shortlisted by AmericanPhoto for as one of the 10 best documentary books of 2014. The book is also the subject of a video documentary by Vice Media.

World Press Award 
Brown was awarded a World Press Photo award in the category "General news, singles" in 2018 for his work documenting the Rohingya refugees in Bangladesh. The photograph showed the bodies of Rohingya refugees laid out after the boat in which they were attempting to flee Myanmar capsized. The work was commissioned by Panos Pictures, for UNICEF.

References

Australian photojournalists
1969 births
Living people